Jamie Nagle (born 19 December 1986) is an Irish former hurler who played as a midfielder at senior level for the Waterford county team.

Nagle joined the team during the 2007 National League and became a regular member of the starting fifteen over subsequent seasons. Since then he has won one Munster SHC medal and one National Hurling League medal. Nagle has been an All-Ireland SHC runner-up on one occasion.

At club level Nagle was a county intermediate championship medalist with Dungarvan.

Playing career

Club
Nagle played his club hurling with Dungarvan.

In 2009 he won a county intermediate championship following a narrow 1-20 to 2-16 defeat of Clonea.

Inter-county
Nagle made his senior debut for Waterford in the National Hurling League in 2007.

In 2008 Nagle made his senior championship debut; however, all was not well for Waterford. In spite of a poor start and a change of management Nagle's side reached the All-Ireland SHC final for the first time in forty-five years. Kilkenny provided the opposition and went on to trounce Waterford by 3-30 to 1-13 to claim a third consecutive All-Ireland SHC title.

Nagle lined out in another Munster final in 2010 with Cork providing the opposition. A 2-15 apiece draw was the result on that occasion; however, Waterford went on to win the replay after an extra-time goal by Dan Shanahan. It was a first Munster SHC winners' medal for Nagle.

References

1986 births
Living people
Dungarvan hurlers
Irish schoolteachers
Waterford inter-county hurlers